Michael Richards (born 1949) is an American actor best known for playing Cosmo Kramer in Seinfeld.

Michael Richards or Mike Richards may also refer to the following people:

Arts and entertainment
Mike Richards (television personality) (born 1975), American TV producer and game show host
Michael Richards (sculptor) (1963–2001), Jamaican-American sculptor
Mike Richards (broadcaster) (born 1963/64), Canadian sports radio personality
Michael Richards, pseudonym of D. C. Fontana (1939–2019), American television script writer and story editor

Sports
Michael Richards (swimmer) (born 1950), Welsh swimmer
Mike Richards (ice hockey) (born 1985), Canadian ice hockey player
Mike Richards (cyclist) (born 1958), New Zealand Olympian

Other people
Michael Richards (engineer) (1673–1721), Irish military engineer
Michael Adrian Richards (born 1951), British oncologist
Michael Richards (academic), archaeological scientist and researcher

See also
Michael Richard (disambiguation)